Bucksburn railway station served the suburb of Bucksburn, Aberdeenshire, Scotland from 1854 to 1968 on the Great North of Scotland Railway.

History 
The station opened as Buxburn on 20 September 1854 by the Great North of Scotland Railway. The name changed to Bucksburn on 1 January 1897. The station closed to passengers on 5 March 1956 and closed to goods on 22 April 1968.

References

External links 

Disused railway stations in Aberdeenshire
Former Great North of Scotland Railway stations
Railway stations in Great Britain opened in 1854
Railway stations in Great Britain closed in 1956
1854 establishments in Scotland
1968 disestablishments in Scotland